Albert Macovski is an American Professor (Emeritus) at Stanford University, known for his many innovations in the area of imaging, particularly in the medical field. He graduated from NYU Poly.

He has over 150 patents and has authored over 200 technical articles. His innovations include the single-tube color camera and real-time phased array imaging for ultrasound. He has also made significant contributions to magnetic resonance imaging (MRI), computerized axial tomography (CAT scans), and digital radiography.

His honors include Founding Fellow of the American Institute for Medical and Biological Engineering, the IEEE Zworykin Award, and the gold medal of the International Society of Magnetic Resonance.

References

External links
 Smart Computing Encyclopedia Entry
 Stanford Faculty Page
 Description of ultrasound phased array patent
 Academic genealogy

1929 births
Living people
20th-century American inventors
21st-century American inventors
American electrical engineers
Members of the United States National Academy of Engineering
Polytechnic Institute of New York University alumni
Fellows of the American Institute for Medical and Biological Engineering
Stanford University faculty
Members of the National Academy of Medicine